Anupalabdhi  (Sanskrit: अनुपलब्धि) means 'non-recognition', 'non-perception'. This word refers to the Pramana of Non-perception which consists in the presentative knowledge of negative facts.

Hinduism

Anupalabdhi or abhāvapramāṇa is the Pramana of Non-perception admitted by Kumārila for the perception of non-existence of a thing. He holds that the non-existence of a thing cannot be perceived by the senses for there is nothing with which the senses could come into contact in order to perceive the non-existence.

According to the Bhāṭṭa school of Pūrva-Mīmāṃsā and Advaita-Vedānta system of philosophy, Anupalabdhi is a way to apprehend an absence; it is regarded as a means of knowledge, the other five being – pratyakṣa ('perception'), anumāna ('inference'), śabda ('testimony'), upamāna ('comparison') and arthāpatti ('presumption'). The perception of negation or non-existence in its various forms is also due to the relation of attributiveness.

All things exist in places either in a positive (sadrupa) or in a negative (asadrūpa) relation, and it is only in the former case that they come into contact with the senses, while in the latter case the perception of the negative existence can only be had by a separate mode of movement of the mind, a separate pramāṇa – anupalabdhi.

Indirect knowledge of non-existence can be attained by other means but direct knowledge of non-existence of perceptible objects and their attributes is available only through this kind of pramāṇa which is not inference.

There are four  verities of Anupalabdhi which have been identified, they are  – a) kāraṇa-anupalabdhi or 'non-perception of the causal condition', b) vyāpaka-anupalabdhi or 'non-perception of the pervader', c) svabhāva-anupalabdhi or 'non-perception of presence of itself', and d) viruddha-anupalabdhi or 'non-perception of the opposed'. The lack of perceptible (yogya) adjuncts (upādhi) is known through non-perception of what is perceptible (yogya-anupalabdhi) and the lack of imperceptible adjuncts is known by showing that which is thought to be an adjunct.

The followers of Prabhākara and the Vishishtadvaita do not accept anupalabdhi as a separate parmāṇa because the same sense organs which apprehend an entity can also cognize its abhāva or the non-existence.

Buddhism

According to Dharmakirti, anupalabdhi is the affirmative assertion of a negative prediction, and is same as anumāna of an abhāva.

References

Hindu philosophical concepts
Buddhist philosophical concepts
Vedanta
Sanskrit words and phrases